You Can't Make Love Alone is a live album by the American saxophonist/vocalist Eddie "Cleanhead" Vinson recorded at the Montreux Jazz Festival in 1971 and originally released by Mega Records on their Flying Dutchman Series.

Reception

AllMusic reviewer Scott Yanow stated "Eddie "Cleanhead" Vinson was in inspired form at the 1971 Montreux Jazz Festival. He stole the show ... the quality of his performance (on which Vinson is joined by the guitars of Larry Coryell and Cornell Dupree, pianist Neal Creque, bassist Chuck Rainey and drummer Pretty Purdie) makes this album still worth acquiring".

Track listing
All compositions by Eddie "Cleanhead" Vinson except where noted
 "Straight, No Chaser" (Thelonious Monk) − 3:41
 "Cleanhead Blues" − 3:53
 "You Can't Make Love Alone" (George David Weiss, Bob Thiele) − 4:35
 "I Had a Dream" − 5:40
 "Person to Person" (Vinson, Charles Singleton, Teddy McRae) − 6:01

Personnel
Eddie "Cleanhead" Vinson − alto saxophone, vocals
Cornell Dupree, Larry Coryell − guitar
Neal Creque − piano
Chuck Rainey − bass
Bernard Purdie – drums

References

1971 live albums
Eddie Vinson live albums
Albums produced by Bob Thiele
Mega Records live albums
Flying Dutchman Records live albums
Albums recorded at the Montreux Jazz Festival